Xinzhuang District is a district in the western part of New Taipei in northern Taiwan.

History

A former name of the area is Pulauan. On 15 January 1980, Xinzhuang was upgraded from an urban township to be a county-administered city of Taipei County. On 25 December 2010, Taipei County was upgraded to New Taipei City, and Xinzhuang City was upgraded to a district.

Overview
The district is bordered by Wugu and Taishan to the north, Sanchong to the east, Banqiao and Shulin to the south, and Taoyuan City to the west.

Government agencies
 Council of Indigenous Peoples
 Hakka Affairs Council
 Ministry of Culture

Educational institutions

Colleges 
Fu Jen Catholic University

Senior High Schools 
New Taipei Municipal DanFeng High School
New Taipei Municipal Hsinchuang Senior High School
Heng Yee Catholic High School (天主教恆毅中學)
National Xinzhuang High School (國立新莊高級中學)

Infrastructures
 Taipei Hospital

Tourist attractions
 Cihyou Temple
 Losheng Sanatorium
 Siangrenhe Clock and Drum Workshop
 Temple to Erudition Deity
 Temple to the Martial Deity
 Xinzhuang Baseball Stadium
 Xinzhuang Culture and Arts Center

Transportation

The TRA section between Fuzhou and Shulin passes through Xinzhuang District, but no station is currently planned.

Taipei Metro
 Danfeng metro station
 Fu Jen University metro station
 Huilong metro station
 Touqianzhuang metro station
 Xinzhuang metro station
 Xingfu metro station
 New Taipei Industrial Park metro station

Taoyuan Airport MRT
 New Taipei Industrial Park metro station
 Xinzhuang Fuduxin metro station

Notable natives
 Bamboo Chen, actor, acting coach and producer
 Cheng Yu-cheng, member of Legislative Yuan (1981–1987, 1990–1993, 2002–2005)
 Guo Qiusen, former writer
 Jolin Tsai, singer-songwriter and actress
 Timi Zhuo, singer and actress

See also
 New Taipei

References

External links